Karen Dillon is a filmmaker, educator and arts administrator who is currently the Executive Director of the Chandler Center for the Arts. Prior to coming to the Chandler, Dillon was the Executive Director of the Green Mountain Film Festival.

Biography
Dillon was born in Ulysses, Kansas. She received a BFA from the School of Visual Arts in photography and film, and her MFA in film writing, directing and producing from Columbia University. 

Dillon is also a film educator who has taught filmmaking and screenwriting at Columbia University, the Kansas City Art Institute, and Norwich University.  She also lived in Abu Dhabi and worked at Higher Colleges of Technology, Abu Dhabi Women's College teaching media to Emirate women.  She was a founding partner and editor of the magazine, Blue Sky, Green Earth in Lawrence, Kansas. 

She lives on a small farm in Riverton, Vermont and raises dairy goats and saffron.

Awards
Her film script, Birds With Teeth won a screenwriting award from the Alfred P. Sloan Foundation.

References

Living people
American women film directors
American women screenwriters
People from Ulysses, Kansas
Year of birth missing (living people)
21st-century American women